The Portrait of books is a series of topographical works describing the cities, counties, and regions of Britain and some of the regions of France. The series was published by Robert Hale from the late 1960s to the early 1980s and is part of a genre of topographical books in which Robert Hale specialised.

Its immediate predecessors were the County Books and Regional Books series while the Regions of Britain series was published contemporaneously in the 1970s. There was also a Villages series. A number of the Portrait series were republished in new editions titled "The Illustrated Portrait of...".

Described variously as neither literature, a history, or a guide book, the works attempted to sum-up the atmosphere of their area, and "the lives of its people, past and present".

List of titles
This is an incomplete list of titles. Each title was prefixed with the words "Portrait of".
 Aberdeen and Deeside, with Aberdeenshire, Banff and Kincardine by Cuthbert Graham (1972) 
 Argyll and Southern Hebrides by David Graham-Campbell (1978) 
 Avon by John Haddon (1981) 
 Bath by John Haddon (1982) 
 Bedfordshire by David H. Kennett (1978) 
 Birmingham by Vivian Bird
 The Border Country by Nigel Tranter (1972)  (Revised 1987 as The Illustrated Portrait of the Border Country)
 Brecon Beacons and Surrounding Areas by Edmund. J. Mason (1975) 
 Bristol by Keith Brace (1971)  (2nd edition 1976)
 Broadland by Stanley Arthur Manning (1980) 
 Buckinghamshire by John Camp (1972) 
 Burns Country and Galloway &c. by Hugh Douglas (1968)
 Cambridge by Charles Richard Benstead (1968)
 Cambridgeshire by Stanley Arthur Manning
 Canterbury by John Boyle
 The Channel Islands by Raoul Lempriere
 Cheshire by David Bethel
 Chester by David Bethel
 The Clyde by Jack House
 Cornwall by Claude Berry
 The Cotswolds by Edith Brill
 Coventry by E. B. Newbold
 The Dales by Norman Duerden (1978) 
 Dartmoor by Vian Smith
 The River Derwent by Walt Unsworth
 Devon by D. St. Leger-Gordon
 Dorset by Ralph Wightman
 County Durham by Peter A. White
 Edinburgh by Ian Nimmo
 Epping Forest by Sir William Addison
 Essex by Stanley Arthur Manning
 Exmoor by J. H. B. Peel
 The Fen Country by Edward Storey
 Glasgow by Maurice Lindsay
 Gloucestershire by T. A. Ryder
 Gower by Wynford Vaughan-Thomas
 Hertfordshire by Brian J. Bailey
 The Highlands by W. Douglas Simpson
 The Isle of Man by Ernest H. Stenning
 The Isle of Wight by Lawrence Wilson
 The Isles of Scilly by Clive Mumford
 The Lakes by Norman Nicholson
 Lancashire by Jessica Lofthouse
 Leeds by Brian Thompson
 Leicestershire by Brian J. Bailey
 Liverpool by Howard Channon
 London River by Basil E. Cracknell
 Manchester by Michael Kennedy
 The Moray Firth by Cuthbert Graham (1977) 
 The New Forest by Brian Vesey-FitzGerald
 Norfolk by David Yaxley
 Northamptonshire by Peter Gorham Webb
 Northumberland by Nancy Ridley (1965) (2nd Edition 1968) 
 The Spey by Francis G. Thompson
 Wiltshire by Pamela Street (1971) (2nd edition 1980)
 Wye Valley by Harry Luff Verne Fletcher (1968)

See also
County Books series
Regional Books series

References

External links 

Series of non-fiction books
Books about the United Kingdom